Ian Morris may refer to:
Ian Morris (musician) (1957–2010), New Zealand musician
Ian Morris (historian) (born 1960), Willard Professor of Classics at Stanford University
Ian Morris (athlete) (born 1961), Trinidadian athlete
Ian Morris (footballer) (born 1987), Irish footballer
Ian Morris (cricketer) (born 1946), Welsh cricketer